"Better Days" is a song by Belgian singer-songwriter Tom Dice. The song was released as a digital download in Belgium on 2 March 2018 through Universal Music Belgium as the second single from his fourth studio album Better Days (2018).

Track listing

Charts

Release history

References

Tom Dice songs
2018 singles
2017 songs
Songs written by Tom Dice
Songs written by Jeroen Swinnen
Songs written by Ashley Hicklin